The Qollar-aghasi, also spelled Qullar-aqasi,  was the commander of the Safavid Empire's élite gholam (also spelled ghulam) corps. The word means lord of slaves in Azeri (qullar means 'slaves' and ağası means 'lord of'). The holder of the office was one of the most powerful individuals in the entire Safavid state, and in fact by the end of the Safavid-era, he was the most important military official after the qurchi-bashi.

List of Qollar-aghasis

Reign of Abbas I
 Yulqoli Beg (1590)
 Allahverdi Khan (1591)
 Qarachaqay Khan (1617-1624)
 Khosrow Mirza (1629-1632)

Reign of Shah Safi
 Khosrow Mirza (1629-1632) 
 Siyavosh Beg (1632-1655)

Reign of Abbas II
 Siyavosh Beg (1632-1655)
 Allahverdi Khan (1655-1663)
 Jamshid Khan (1663-1667)

Reign of Suleiman I
 Jamshid Khan (1663-1667)
 Kaykhosrow Khan (prior to 1693)
 Mansur Khan (prior to 1693)
 Isa Beg (1693)
 Aslamas Beg (1693-1695)

Reign of Sultan Husayn
 Aslamas Beg (1693-1695)
 Musa Khan (1701)
 Fath-Ali Khan Daghestani (?-1715)
 Safiqoli Khan (1715-1717)
 Rostam Khan (1717-1722)
 Ahmad Agha (1722)
 Bakar Mirza (Shahnavaz) (1722)

Reign of Tahmasp II
 Mohammad Ali Khan (1724)
 Mohammad Mo'men Beg (1730-1732)

Reign of Abbas III
 Mohammad Mo'men Beg (1730-1732)
 Rezaqoli Khan (1733)
 Mohammad-Ali (1734-1736)

Notes

Sources
 
 
 

Qollar-aghasi
Iranian military-related lists
Lists of office-holders in Iran